Domingo González Mateos, better known as Domingo Dominguín (4 August 1895 – 21 August 1958), was a Spanish bullfighter and progenitor of a dynasty of bullfighters.

Career

He was born in Quismondo in the province of Toledo into a peasant family. He left agriculture to take part in rural bullfights until he took his alternativa on 26 September 1917 in Madrid with Joselito (José Gómez Ortega) for sponsor, facing a bull from the Contreras line.

Until 1922 he performed at an honourable level but then suffered a rapid decline and retired from the bullring. He became an apoderado and an outstanding manager of bullfighters, including his youngest son Luis Miguel Dominguín and his future son-in-law Antonio Ordóñez.

Family

Dominguín married Gracia Lucas Lorente, with whom he had five children: Domingo, José, Gracia, Luis Miguel and Carmen. All three sons were well-known bullfighters, as Domingo González Lucas (also known as Dominguín), José González Lucas (also known as Pepe Dominguín) and Luis Miguel Dominguín, the best-known of them, whose son is the singer Miguel Bosé. Dominguín's elder daughter Gracia had a daughter herself who married the bullfighter Ángel Teruel, while his younger daughter Carmen married the bullfighter Antonio Ordóñez; their daughter, the socialite Carmen Ordóñez, married as his first wife the bullfighter Francisco Rivera Pérez, known as Paquirri.

References

Spanish bullfighters
1895 births
1958 deaths